National Route 30 is a national highway in South Korea connects Buan to Daegu. It established on 14 March 1981.

Main stopovers

North Jeolla Province
 Buan County - Gimje - Jeongeup - Imsil County - Jinan County - Muju County
North Gyeongsang Province
 Gimcheon - Seongju County - Gimcheon - Seongju County
Daegu
 Dalseong County - Dalseo District - Seo District

Major intersections

 (■): Motorway
IS: Intersection, IC: Interchange

North Jeolla Province

North Gyeongsang Province

Daegu

References

30
Roads in North Jeolla
Roads in Daegu
Roads in North Gyeongsang